Millard South High School is a fully accredited public high school located in Omaha, Nebraska, United States. The school was established in 1970 as Millard High School.  It is one of four high schools within the Millard Public School District.

Millard South is a member of the Nebraska School Activities Association. Athletic teams are known as the Patriots.   The school colors are red, white and blue.

Athletics

The Patriots have won a number of state championships, listed in the table below.

2011 shooting

On January 5, 2011, Robert Butler Jr., a senior at Millard South, was suspended for trespassing on school grounds after an incident in which he drove his car onto the school's football field on New Year's Day. The suspension was imparted by assistant principal Vicki Kaspar and resulted in Butler being escorted out of the school by security. At 12:45 p.m., Butler returned to the school, armed with a Glock .40-caliber pistol that he had stolen from his father's cabinet, and signed in for an appointment with Kaspar. He then walked into her office and shot her.

Moments later, principal Curtis Case ran out into the hallway and was shot several times in the chest and hip. Butler then walked into the front office area, firing randomly; gunshot debris caused minor injuries to the school nurse. Butler then left the school and drove  to a nearby BP gas station, where he fatally shot himself inside his vehicle. It was later reported that Butler had consumed K2, a type of synthetic cannabis before the shootings.

During the shooting, Millard South went into a lockdown, which was later extended to include all 21,000 students in the Millard School District. Kaspar and Case were hospitalized at Saint Joseph Hospital at Creighton University Medical Center; several hours later, Kaspar died of multiple head and chest wounds. The shooting was the deadliest school shooting in Nebraska's history and the second such incident in the state's modern history, the first being a 1995 shooting in Chadron that left a teacher injured.

Notable alumni
 Bruce Benedict, former MLB catcher for the Atlanta Braves
 Adam DeVine, comedian, co-stars on Workaholics
 Brian Duensing, baseball player (pitcher), 2008 USA Olympic Baseball team, Minnesota Twins
 Jake Ellenberger, professional mixed martial arts (MMA) fighter, signed with the Ultimate Fighting Championship
 Rick Heiserman, former MLB player (St. Louis Cardinals)
 Timothy J. Kadavy, United States Army Lieutenant General, former Adjutant General of the Nebraska National Guard, Director of the Army National Guard
 Ryan Krause, football player, San Diego Chargers
 Tom Sawyer, Representative, Kansas Legislature
 Safi Rauf, Founder and President Human First coalition

References

Public high schools in Nebraska
High schools in Omaha, Nebraska
1970 establishments in Nebraska
Educational institutions established in 1970
Millard Public Schools